The Madakhel is a Pakhtoon/Pashtoon/Pathan tribe. It is a division of the Isazai clan of the Yousafzai tribe.

History

The Madakhels are from the family of The Black Mountain (Tor Ghar) Tribes. They are a division of the Isazai clan of the Yousafzai tribe. Madakhels are the descendants of Mada the son of Isa (Isazai) and the grandson of Yusuf/Yousaf/(Yousafzai). The Madakhels are further divided into four Sections; each Section having two or more sub-sections.

Sections and sub-sections

Geography

Madakhels are among the dwellers on the Tor Ghar. Madakhel country is on the northern slopes of the Mahaban Mountain down to the right bank of the Indus and is bounded on the north by the Hassanzais, on the east by the Indus, on the south and west by the Tanolis and Amazais. Most of the villages are on Mahaban Mountain, with two on the banks of the Indus. The easiest approaches to Madakhel territory pass through Hassanzai territory.

Culture and traditions

Like other Pashtoons, Madakhels maintained their cultural identity and individuality. They lead their lives in accordance with code of ethics of Pashtunwali, which combines Manliness, Goodness, Gallantry, Loyalty and Modesty. Madakhels have also maintained the Pashtoon customs of Jirga (Consultative Assembly), Nanawati (Delegation pleading guilty), Hujhra (Large drawing room) and Melmasteya (Hospitality).

Language

Pushto is the basic language of Madakhels. Living away from urban centres and having less interaction with people from other languages, Madakhels speak purest form of Pushto. Due to migrations for better prospects of life and marriage in non-Pushtoon families, some Madakhels adopted other languages such as Hindko and Urdu.

Recent developments

On 28 January 2011, Tor Ghar became the 25th district of Khyber Pakhtoonkhwa. Judba is the capital of this newly born district with following tehsils:-
 Judba
 Kandar Hassanzai
 Mada Khel

Most of the Mada Khel areas come under the Mada Khel tehsil.

References 

Social groups of Pakistan
Yusufzai Pashtun tribes